Lee So-ra is the name of:

 Lee So-ra (model) (born 1969), South Korean model
 Lee So-ra (singer) (born 1969), South Korean singer
 Lee So-ra (volleyball) (born 1987), South Korean volleyball player
 Lee So-ra (tennis) (born 1994), South Korean tennis player